Project X is a 1949 American  thriller film directed by Edward Montagne and starring Keith Andes. It was also known as Red Bait.

Plot summary

Cast
 Keith Andes as Steve Monahan
 Rita Colton as Sandra Russell
 Jack Lord as John Bates
 Kit Russell as Michael Radik
 Joyce Quinlan as Joan
 Harry Clark as Jed
 Robert Noe as Henderson
 Joanne Tree as Gert
 Craig Kelly as Martin
 Tom Ahearne as Fraser (as Tom Ahearn)
 Dorothy Renard as Secretary Henderson
 William Gibberson as Hadwaiter

References

External links
 
 
 
 
 

1949 films
1940s thriller films
Film Classics films
Films directed by Edward Montagne
American thriller films
American black-and-white films
1940s English-language films
1940s American films